Jhabua railway station is a proposed railway station in Jhabua district, Madhya Pradesh. Its code is JHBUA. It will serve Jhabua city. The station proposal includes two platforms. The work on this rail line is expected to be finished year 2024.

References

Railway stations in Jhabua district
Ratlam railway division
Proposed railway stations in India